Aaron Green may refer to:

Aaron Green (American football) (born 1992), American football running back
Aaron Green (architect) (1917–2001), American architect
Mr. Green (record producer)